Chinitas's Cafe (Spanish: Café de Chinitas) is a 1960 Spanish film directed by Gonzalo Delgrás.

Cast
 Frank Braña 
 Ricardo Canales 
 Manuel de Juan 
 Eulália del Pino
 Rafael Farina
 Rafael Hernández 
 Delia Luna 
 Antonio Molina 
 Eva Tusset 
 Enrique Ávila

References

Bibliography 
 Bentley, Bernard. A Companion to Spanish Cinema. Boydell & Brewer, 2008.

External links 
 

1960 films
Spanish musical comedy films
1960s Spanish-language films
Films directed by Gonzalo Delgrás
1960s Spanish films